is a Japanese avant-garde theatre director, writer, and philosopher.

He is the founder and director of the Suzuki Company of Toga (SCOT), and organizer of Japan’s first international theatre festival (Toga Festival). With American director Anne Bogart, he co-founded the Saratoga International Theatre Institute in Saratoga Springs, New York.  

He is the creator of the "Suzuki method" of actor training, which emphasizes stylized body work and physicality drawing from dance and elements of traditional Japanese theater. 

Suzuki was general artistic director of Shizuoka Performing Arts Center (SPAC) (1995~2007), an international committee member of the Theatre Olympics; a founding member of the BeSeTo Festival (演劇祭), jointly organized by leading theatre artists from Japan, China and Korea; and, chairman of the Board of Directors for the Japan Performing Arts Foundation, a nationwide network of theatre professionals in Japan.

Career
Suzuki became involved in the Angura ("underground") theater movement in Japan in the early 1960s, and founded a theater troupe called the Waseda Little Theatre,  which focused on the physical talents of star actress Kayoko Shiraishi. It was with the Waseda Little Theatre that Suzuki began to develop his Suzuki Method of actor training.

Suzuki's works include On the Dramatic Passions”, The Trojan Women, Dionysus, Vision of Lear, Cyrano de Bergerac, and Madame de Sade, among others.

Besides productions with his own company, he has directed several international collaborations, such as The Tale of Lear (1988), co-produced and presented by four leading regional theatres in the US, many of whose actors had studied with him; King Lear, presented with the Moscow Art Theatre; Oedipus Rex, co-produced by Cultural Olympiad and the Düsseldorf Schauspielhaus; and Electra, produced by Ansan Arts Center / Arco Arts Theatre in Korea and the Taganka Theatre in Russia.

He relocated his company from Tokyo to the remote mountain village of Toga in 1976. The Toga Art Park now comprises six theaters, rehearsal facilities, offices, lodgings, and restaurants. It continues to host a summer and winter season of performances, symposiums, workshops and competitions.

Teaching and writing
Suzuki has articulated his theories in a number of books. A collection of his writings in English, The Way of Acting, is published by Theatre Communications Group (US). 

He has taught his system of actor training in schools and theatres throughout the world, including The Juilliard School in New York and the Moscow Art Theatre. The Cambridge University Press published The Theatre of Suzuki Tadashi as part of their Directors in Perspective series, featuring leading theatre directors of the 20th century. This series includes works on Meyerhold, Brecht, Strehler, Peter Brook and Robert Wilson among others.

Bibliography
 Culture is the Body by Tadashi Suzuki
 Fragments of Glass: A Conversation between Hijikata Tatsumi and Suzuki Tadashi
 Interview: The Word Is an Act of the Body by William O. Beeman, Tadashi Suzuki and Kosho Kadogami
 The Way of Acting: The Theatre Writings of Tadashi Suzuki by Tadashi Suzuki, Theatre Communications Group, (1993),

References

Further reading
 James R. Brandon, Training at the Waseda Little Theatre: The Suzuki Methodby
 Ian Carruthers and Yasunari Takahashi, The Theatre of Tadashi Suzuki, Cambridge University Press, (2004) 
 David G. Goodman, The Return of the Gods: Theatre in Japan Today 
 Tatsuro Ishii, Kazuko Yoshiyuki on Acting
 Jadwiga Rodowicz, Rethinking Zeami: Talking to Kanze Tetsunojo

External links 
 The Suzuki Company of Toga (SCOT) homepage (English)
 5th Theatre Olympics in Seoul
 BeSeTo Theatre Festival
 Saratoga International Theatre Institute (SITI)
 The International Theatre Laboratorium-USA (ITL-USA)
 Zen Zen Zo Physical Theatre
  OzFrank Theatre and Suzuki Method of Actor Training (SMAT)/ Frank Suzuki Actors Knowhow (FSAK)

Living people
Theatre in Japan
Japanese dramatists and playwrights
Japanese theatre directors
1939 births
People from Shizuoka (city)